Kako or KAKO may refer to:


Acronyms
 KAKO (FM), a radio station licensed to Ada, Oklahoma, United States
 Colorado Plains Regional Airport (ICAO code), Colorado Plains, Colorado, United States

Arts and entertainment
 "Kako", a song by Kazunari Ninomiya of Arashi from the album 2004 Arashi! Iza, Now Tour!!
 Kako, a main character in Noggin's Oobi television show
 Kako Band, an Iranian band

Military
 Japanese cruiser Kako, a 1925 heavy cruiser sunk in World War II
 Kako, a discontinued Japanese Sendai-class cruiser (1922)

People
 Kako (musician) (1936–1994), Puerto Rican percussionist and bandleader
 Princess Kako of Akishino (born 1994), member of the Imperial House of Japan

Places
 Kako District, Hyōgo, Japan
 Kako, Bihar, a town in India
 Kako River, Guyana

Other uses
 Kako language, a Bantu language spoken mainly in Cameroon
 Kako Senior Secondary School, Masaka, Uganda